Salarabad (also Romanized as Sālārābād) is a village in Gavdul-e Gharbi Rural District, in the Central District of Malekan County, East Azerbaijan Province, Iran. At the 2006 census, its population was 82, in 25 families.

References 

Populated places in Malekan County